Ratzenhofer is an Austrian surname. Notable people with the surname include:

 Gustav Ratzenhofer (1842–1904), Austrian officer, philosopher, and sociologist
 Emil Ratzenhofer (born 1914) and Herta Ratzenhofer (born 1921), two Austrian pair skaters

German-language surnames